Charles Doig may refer to:

 Charles C. Doig (1855–1918), a Scottish architect
 Charles Doig, Sr. (1883–1944), Australian rules football player and coach
 Charles Doig, Jr. (1912–1980), Australian rules footballer, son of the above

See also
 Doig family
 Doig (surname)